Hunter Reid Gaddis (born April 9, 1998) is an American professional baseball pitcher for the Cleveland Guardians of Major League Baseball (MLB). He made his MLB debut in 2022.

Amateur career
Gaddis atteneded Sequoyah High School in Canton, Georgia, and enrolled at Georgia State University to play college baseball for the Georgia State Panthers. As a sophomore, he was named second team All-Sun Belt Conference after he went 9–4 with a 2.95 earned run average (ERA) with 98 strikeouts. In 2018, he played collegiate summer baseball with the Chatham Anglers of the Cape Cod Baseball League. Gaddis repeated as a second team All-Sun Belt selection as a junior despite a 1–7 record and led the conference with 112 strikeouts.

Professional career
The Cleveland Indians selected Gaddis in the fifth round of the 2019 Major League Baseball draft. After signing with the team he was initially assigned to the Arizona League Indians before being promoted to the Class A Short-Season Mahoning Valley Scrappers. Gaddis did not play a minor league game in 2020 due to the cancellation of the minor league season caused by the COVID-19 pandemic. He spent the 2021 season with the High-A Lake County Captains and went 4–11 with a 4.16 ERA and 127 strikeouts in  innings pitched. Gaddis was assigned to the Double-A Akron RubberDucks at the start of the 2022 season.

On August 5, 2022, the Cleveland Guardians selected Gaddis' contract from the Triple-A Columbus Clippers.

References

External links

1998 births
Living people
Akron RubberDucks players
Arizona League Indians players
Baseball players from Georgia (U.S. state)
Chatham Anglers players
Cleveland Guardians players
Columbus Clippers players
Georgia State Panthers baseball players
Lake County Captains players
Mahoning Valley Scrappers players
Major League Baseball pitchers
People from Canton, Georgia